LY-487,379 is a drug used in scientific research that acts as a selective positive allosteric modulator for the metabotropic glutamate receptor group II subtype mGluR2. It is used to study the structure and function of this receptor subtype, and LY-487,379 along with various other mGluR2/3 agonists and positive modulators are being investigated as possible antipsychotic and anxiolytic drugs.

See also 
 Eglumegad
 HYDIA

References 

Eli Lilly and Company brands
MGlu2 receptor agonists
MGlu3 receptor agonists